Ōsako, Osako, Oosako, Ousako or Ohsako (written: 大迫) is a Japanese surname. Notable people with the surname include:

, Japanese judoka
, Japanese footballer
, Japanese footballer
, Imperial Japanese Army general
, Imperial Japanese Army general
, Japanese long-distance runner

, Japanese golfer
, Japanese footballer

Japanese-language surnames